CYP303A1 (ORF Name: Dmel_CG4163) is an insect gene belongs to the cytochrome P450 family, first found in Drosophila melanogaster, highly expressed in pupal stage. Its ortholog also found in Locusta migratoria.

References 

303
Drosophila melanogaster genes
EC 1.14